Canción de Alerta is the first album by the Puerto Rican reggae band, Cultura Profética. It was recorded in Jamaica at Marley Music Studios and released in 1998 under the Tuff Gong label.

Track listing
 "Enyoyando" - 1:11
Music: Iván Gutiérrez
Singers: Alrick Thompson, Ras "Rodjah"
 "Con truenos hay que hablar" - 5:32
Music: Cultura Profética
Singers: Rodríguez, Boris Bilbraut
 "Despertar" - 4:06
Singer: Rodríguez
 "Lucha y Sacrificio" - 5:12
Lyrics: Vegoeli de Cuacio
Music: Eliut González, Rodríguez, Gutiérrez
Singer: Bilbraut
 "Por qué cantamos" - 6:38
Lyrics: Mario Benedetti
Singer: Rodríguez
 "Pasiones, Guerrillas y Muertes" - 4:56
Lyrics: Bilbraut
Music: Cultura Profética
Singer: Bilbraut
 "Advertencia" - 6:01
Singer: Rodríguez
 "Protesto" - 5:00
Lyrics: Bilbraut
Singer: Bilbraut
 "Population Disorder" - 3:46
Music: Rodríguez
Singer: Rodríguez
 "Tempestad Tranquila" - 3:37
Music: Gutiérrez
Singer: Bilbraut
 "Fruto de la Tierra" - 4:23
Music: Gutiérrez
Singer: Rodríguez
 "Filitustrein" - 3:04
Music: Gutiérrez
Singers: Alrick Thompson, Ras "Rodjah"

All lyrics written by Willy Rodríguez and all music written by Rodríguez and Iván Gutiérrez, except where noted.

Musicians
 Willy Rodríguez - fretless bass, lead vocals
 Boris Bilbraut - drums, lead vocals
 Iván Gutiérrez - hohner clavinet, piano, trumpet, background vocals
 Eliut González - lead guitar, acoustic guitar, background vocals
 Juan Costa - rhythm guitar
 Raúl Gaztambide - organ
 Eduardo Fernández - trombone
 Javier Joglar - tenor sax, flute
 María Soledad Gaztambide - vocals

Additional musicians
 Omar Cruz - percussion

Production
 Produced by Raúl López and Cultura Profética.
 Executive produced by Anibal and Jorge Jover, from CDT Records.

Recording
 Recorded and mixed at Marley Music Studios, Kingston, Jamaica
 Recording and mix engineer - Eroll Brown
 Assistant engineer - Alrick Thompson
 Mastered at DRS in Levittown, Puerto Rico, by Estebán Piñero

References

1998 albums
Cultura Profética albums